The Volkswagen EA211 engine (EA = development order), also called modular gasoline engine kit, is a family of inline-three and inline-four petrol engines with variable valve timing developed by Volkswagen Group in 2011. They all include a four-stroke engine and dual overhead camshaft drive into exhaust manifolds.

1.0 R3 12v
IdentificationParts code prefix: 04E, ID code: CHYA, CHYB, CHZD, DSHA, CSEB, DHSB
Engine displacement & engine configuration  inline three engine (R3/I3); bore x stroke: , bore spacing: , stroke ratio: 0.99:1 – 'square engine',  cylinder, compression ratio: 10.5:1
Cylinder block & crankcase Cast aluminium alloy; four main bearings, die-forged steel crankshaft
Cylinder head & valvetrain Cast aluminium alloy; four strokes per cylinder, 12 valves total, double overhead camshaft (DOHC)
Aspiration  Natural and turbocharged
Fuel system Multi-point electronic indirect fuel injection with three intake manifold-sited fuel injectors
DIN-rated motive power & torque outputs
 at 5,000–6,000 rpm;  at 3,000–4,300 rpm (CHYA)
 at 6,200 rpm;  at 3,000–4,300 rpm (CHYB)
 at 6,350 rpm;  at 3,000 rpm with Ethanol (CSEB)
 at 5,000–5,500 rpm;  at 1500–3,500 rpm (CHZB)
 at 5,000 - 5,500 rpm;  at 1,750-4,000 rpm (DSHA)
 at 5,000–5,500 rpm;  at 2000–3,500 rpm (CHZD)
 at 5,500 rpm;  at 2,000-3,500 rpm with Ethanol (DHSB)

Applications Volkswagen up!, Škoda Citigo, Škoda Fabia III, Seat Mii, Seat Ibiza, Seat Arona, Volkswagen Golf VII, Volkswagen Polo, Volkswagen T-Roc,Volkswagen T-Cross, Volkswagen Taigo, Audi A1 (GB), SEAT León (4th Gen), Volkswagen Taigun, Volkswagen Virtus, Skoda Slavia, Skoda Kushaq.

1.2 TSI
1.2 TSI 63 kW
 at 4,800 rpm;  at 1,400–3,200 rpm (CJZB)
 at 4,300-5,300 rpm;  at 1,400–3,500 rpm (CYVA)
1.2 TSI 66 kW
 at 4,400–5,400 rpm;  at 1,400–3,500 rpm (CJZC, CYVA)
1.2 TSI 77 kW
 at 4,500–5,000 rpm;  at 1,400–3,500 rpm (CJZA)
1.2 TSI 81 kW
 at 4,600–5,600 rpm;  at 1,400–4,000 rpm (CYVB,CJZD)

1.4 TSI
DIN-rated motive power & torque outputs, ID codes
 at 4,800-6,000 rpm;  at 1,500-3,500 rpm — CPWA
 at 5,000-6,000 rpm;  at 1,400-4,000 rpm — CMBA, CPVA,CXSA
 at 5,000-6,000 rpm;  at 1,400-4,000 rpm — CZCA, CPVB
 at 4,500-6,000 rpm;  at 1,500-3,500 rpm — CHPA, CPTA
 at 5,000-6,000 rpm;  at 1,500-3,500 rpm — CZDA, CZEA, CZTA
 at 5,000 rpm;  at 1,400 rpm — CUKB (Data concerning the ICE engine only and not the Hybrid system)

1.6 MPI
DIN-rated motive power & torque outputs, ID codes
 at 5,200 rpm;  at 3,800-4,000 rpm — CWVB
 at 5,800 rpm;  at 3,800-4,000 rpm — CWVA
(For CIS countries only)

See also
List of Volkswagen Group engines

References

EA211
Straight-three engines
Straight-four engines